The Nova gas field is a natural gas field located in the Timor Sea. It was discovered in 2000 and developed by Tangiers Petroleum. It began production in 2001 and produces natural gas and condensates. The total proven reserves of the Nova gas field are around 6.93 trillion cubic feet (198 km³), and production is slated to be around 200 million cubic feet/day (5.7×105m³).

References

Natural gas fields in Australia